"The Last of the Clan McDuck" is a 1992 Scrooge McDuck comic by Don Rosa. It is the first of the original 12 chapters in the series The Life and Times of Scrooge McDuck. The story takes place from 1877 to 1880 when Scrooge is a child in Glasgow, Scotland. He comes in conflict with The Whiskervilles, earns his Number One Dime and heads for the United States on a cattle boat.

It is the first appearance of Scrooge's mother Downy O'Drake. Scrooge's Uncle Jake McDuck appears for the first time in this story even though he was mentioned in A Christmas for Shacktown. 

The story was first published in the Danish Anders And & Co. #1992-33; the first American publication was in Uncle Scrooge #285, in April 1994.

Plot
As a child, Scrooge grows up in a poor family that has a rivalry with the Whiskervilles clan. When he gets his first job as a shoe shiner, his first customer presents him with extremely filthy work boots, but pays him with an American coin (a dime). Furious at being cheated, Scrooge makes a vow to always be "fair and square" in business and becomes much more cunning and gets more business. He later earns more money first by selling firewood and then by selling peat moss.

Family legend, meanwhile, states that the McDuck family was heir to a castle and large fortune. Quackly McDuck, one of their ancestors, determined to hide the treasure from thieves, sealed it away inside the castle (accidentally sealing himself away at the same time). The family was frightened away from the land by a "phantom hound" and, as a result, the treasure was lost while the castle fell to ruin. 

While exploring the castle, Scrooge discovers that the hound only was a trick by the Whiskervilles, who wanted the McDuck family out of the way so that they could steal the hidden treasure. Encouraged by a strange keeper in the castle, Scrooge gets revenge for his family by filling a suit of armor with peat and setting it on fire, scaring the Whiskervilles into thinking it was a ghost. Inspired by the keeper, Scrooge decides to go to America to earn his fortune. After Scrooge leaves the castle, the keeper reveals himself as Quackly McDuck, the ghost of the ancestor who was sealed away in the wall. When asked by the ghosts of the other ancestors why he didn't simply just show Scrooge the location of the treasure, he explains that the boy must earn his fortune himself.

See also
 "The Last of the Clan McDuck" served as the title story to Fantagraphics'' Uncle Scrooge and Donald Duck: The Don Rosa Library Vol. 4

External links

"The Last of the Clan McDuck" on Duckman
The Life and Times of $crooge McDuck - Episode 1

Disney comics stories
Donald Duck comics by Don Rosa
Fiction set in 1877
Fiction set in 1878
Fiction set in 1879
Fiction set in 1880
1994 in comics
Comics set in the 19th century
Comics set in Scotland
Works set in castles
The Life and Times of Scrooge McDuck